Mundathicode  is a village in. Wadakkanchery municipality.  Thrissur district in the state of Kerala, India.

Demographics
As of 2001 India census, Mundathicode had a population of 6,049 with 2,862 males and 3,187 females.

Tourism
Pooram (Malayalam: പൂരം) is one of the most popular temple festival of this region. Periyammakavu, Ayyapan kavu, kodasherry temple kavadi, and Pathirakottu kavu Temple Pooram is an important religious tourist destination of this place.

References

Villages in Thrissur district